The 1828 New South Wales census was the first population census held in the Crown Colony of New South Wales. The month used for the census, was taken in November 1828. The total population of the colony was counted as 36,598 and recorded all inhabitants, both convict and free. Only the European population were enumerated. Censuses were taken periodically in the colony thereafter.

History

Before 1828, the population count was originally gathered through surveys and musters, however they were largely undercounted. The first survey of the NSW settlement was made in 1795. The general musters were held annually from 1795 to 1825 with separate ones being taken, for example - musters of settlers, livestock, convicts, or ones that included only males, females or children. An act (9 Geo IV No. 4) was passed to allow the census. The incumbent Governor Sir Ralph Darling on 29 July 1828 transferred to the Rt. Hon. William Huskisson for King George IV's approval.

Census questions
Information recorded in the census included:
Name of inhabitant
Age
Free or bond
Ship name on which arrived
Year arrived
Sentence
Religion
Employment
Residence
District
Total number of acres
Number of acres cleared
Number of acres cultivated
Number of horses
Number of horned cattle
Number of sheep

Results
The total population was counted as 36,598, 20,870 were free and 15,728 were convicts. There were 25,248 Protestants and 11,236 Catholics. The Indigenous population were not counted.

A quote from the Sydney Gazette in December 1828 describes life as:

Religion
The following table is compiled from the actual religion given on the returns and from the Public Record Office.

Land and livestock
Showing the numbers of land and livestock.

Copies
Only two copies of the census results were produced, all compiled within two years of the census. One comprising six-volumes was kept in New South Wales (NRS 1272), with a seven-volume draft copy sent to the Public Record Office (PRO) in London. Copies are available on microfilm from the State Archives and Records NSW and from The National Archives (TNA) at Kew. The copy in Sydney was handed over in 1901 to the Registrar General; kept in a locked case and highly guarded for over 60 years. In 2019 the Records of the 1828 Census held by NSW State Archives and Records were inscribed on the UNESCO Australian Memory of the World Register.

See also
Census of Australia

Archival Holdings 

 NRS 1272, 1828 Census: Alphabetical returns, held by NSW State Archives and Records

References

Censuses in Australia
Australian Bureau of Statistics
1828 in Australia
Australia